İlter Ayyıldız (born 31 July 1992) is an Austrian professional footballer who plays as a left winger for Turkish club Batman Petrolspor.

Career
On 26 August 2019, Ayyildiz joined Sarıyer in the TFF Second League.

On 29 July 2021, he returned to Horn.

Personal life
Ayyildiz is of Turkish descent.

References

External links

Ilter Ayyildiz at ÖFB

1992 births
Austrian people of Turkish descent
Living people
Austrian footballers
Association football midfielders
SV Schwechat players
FC Admira Wacker Mödling players
SV Horn players
Nazilli Belediyespor footballers
Kırklarelispor footballers
Sarıyer S.K. footballers
Vanspor footballers
Batman Petrolspor footballers
Austrian Football Bundesliga players
2. Liga (Austria) players
Austrian Regionalliga players
TFF Second League players
Austrian expatriate footballers
Expatriate footballers in Turkey
Austrian expatriate sportspeople in Turkey